Wolfgang Schöne (born 9 February 1940) is a German bass-baritone in opera and concert.

Career 
Schöne was born in Bad Gandersheim.  He began his studies of voice at the Hochschule für Musik und Theater Hannover with Naan Põld in 1964 and moved with him to the Hochschule für Musik und Theater Hamburg in 1986, achieving his diploma as a concert singer and music teacher in 1969.

He was engaged at the Stadttheater Lübeck and at the Wuppertal Opera.

After singing the part of Guglielmo in Mozart's Così fan tutte as a guest, he was engaged in 1973 at the Staatstheater Stuttgart, staying a member until 2005. He was awarded the title Kammersänger in 1978 and is Ehrenmitglied (Honorary Member) of the Staatsoper Stuttgart since 2007. He sang regularly at the Wiener Staatsoper from 1974 until 1993.

He appeared regularly at the Salzburg Festival. His roles there have included Almaviva in Mozart's Le nozze di Figaro (1985–1987, 1990) and Alidoro in Rossini's La Cenerentola (1988–1989). He sang in a 1988 concert performance of Gottfried von Einem's Der Prozeß and in 2002 the part of Gyges in Zemlinsky's Der König Kandaules, conducted by Kent Nagano. In 2005 he appeared as Ludovico Nardi in Franz Schreker's Die Gezeichneten.

He was a guest at the Semperoper in Dresden in 1999 as Barak in Die Frau ohne Schatten by Richard Strauss and in 2000 in the title role of Wagner's Der fliegende Holländer. In 2002 he sang for the first time the part of Hans Sachs in Wagner's Die Meistersinger von Nürnberg at the Hamburg State Opera. In 2003 he portrayed Moses in Schoenberg's Moses und Aron in Stuttgart.

In 2008, he first performed Scarpia in Puccini's Tosca in Stuttgart. In 2009, he appeared at the Semperoper as Der alte Mann (The old man) in Henze's L'Upupa und der Triumph der Sohnesliebe.

Wolfgang Schöne sang in the premieres of Die Versuchung by Josef Tal in 1976 at the Bayerische Staatsoper, in Hamlet of Hermann Reutter in 1980 in Stuttgart, the part of Tom, Minette's lover in Henze's Die englische Katze, with Inga Nielsen as Minette, at the Schwetzingen Festival in 1983, and in 1992 at the Deutsche Oper Berlin the leading part of K. in Aribert Reimann's Das Schloß.

Schöne sang at international opera houses, as Dr. Schön in Berg's Lulu in 1996 at the Glyndebourne Festival and in 1998 at the Opéra Bastille, as Barak in Die Frau ohne Schatten of Richard Strauss in 2000 at the Gran Teatre del Liceu, and as Amfortas in Wagner's Parsifal in 2003 and 2004 at the Teatro La Fenice. He also sang this role in Hans-Jürgen Syberberg's film, although he did not appear on screen.

In concert he performed especially the cantatas, masses and oratorios of Bach, such as his Christmas Oratorio, St Matthew Passion and St John Passion, recording especially with Helmuth Rilling.

References

External links 
 Wolfgang Schöne on the website of Konzertdirektion Schmid
 Entries for recordings by Wolfgang Schöne on WorldCat

1940 births
Living people
People from Northeim (district)
German bass-baritones
German operatic baritones
Hochschule für Musik, Theater und Medien Hannover alumni